Paolo Giordano (born 1982) is an Italian writer who won  the Premio Strega literary award with his first novel The Solitude of Prime Numbers.

Biography 

Paolo Giordano was born on December 19, 1982, in Turin, Italy. He studied physics at the University of Turin and holds a PhD in theoretical particle physics. The Solitude of Prime Numbers, his first novel,  has sold over a million copies and was translated into thirty languages.

The Italian language film based on the novel was released in September 2010.

His book How Contagion Works is one of the first to be written on the COVID-19 pandemic and warns of the danger of authoritarianism.

Bibliography 
 2008: The Solitude of Prime Numbers (published in Italian as La solitudine dei numeri primi)
 2012: The Human Body (published in Italian as Il corpo umano)
 2014: Like Family (published in Italian as Il nero e l'argento)
 2018: Divorare il cielo
 2020: How Contagion Works (published in Italian as Nel contagio)
 2022: Tasmania

Filmography 
 As writer
 Dry (2022)

Awards 
 2008: Strega Prize (The Solitude of Prime Numbers)
 2008: Premio Campiello for a first novel (The Solitude of Prime Numbers)

References

External links

 Paolo Giordano interview English language interview with Paolo Giordano
Audio: Paolo Giordano in conversation on the BBC World Service discussion programme The Forum

1982 births
Living people
Writers from Turin
21st-century Italian novelists
Strega Prize winners